Ang Anino ni Asedillo is a 1988 Filipino period action film directed by Bert Mendoza and Jose M. Dagumboy. A sequel to the 1971 biographical film Asedillo, it stars Conrad Poe, Dante Rivero, George Estregan, Philip Gamboa, Carlos Salazar, Zandro Zamora, Beverly Vergel, Guia Guizon, and Farrah Floro; Fernando Poe Jr. is featured in archival footage from the previous film. Produced by D'Camp Films International, the film was released on June 1, 1988. Critic Lav Diaz gave the film a negative review, criticizing its direction, writing, production design, technical qualities, and action scenes.

Plot
Simon Crisostomo idolizes Teodoro Asedillo as a kid in the provincial town of San Antonio, wishing to become a righteous teacher like him someday. Fifteen years later, Simon has since become a factory worker in Manila during the Magsaysay administration. When an official from his company rapes and murders his girlfriend, Simon confronts the official and kills him, thus forcing him to return to San Antonio. Upon arrival, he discovers the town's land has been taken over by a greedy don and his henchmen, who have replaced the farmers' crops of rice with sugar cane. Simon then teams up with Alfonso to plan the don's defeat and return the land back to the farmers.

Cast

Conrad Poe as Simon Crisostomo
Dante Rivero as Sangre
George Estregan as Tandang Birong
Philip Gamboa
Carlos Salazar
Zandro Zamora
Beverly Vergel
Guia Guizon
Farrah Floro
Fernando Poe Jr. as Teodoro Asedillo (archival footage)
Romy Diaz
Ruben Rustia
Nick Romano
Vic Varrion
Val Iglesia
Rey Sagum
Danny Riel
Joe Andrade
Rene Matias
Rene Romero
Robert Miller
Ramon 'Boy' Bagatsing Jr.

Production
The score for Ang Anino ni Asedillo was composed in February 1988.

Release
Ang Anino ni Asedillo was graded "B" by the Movie and Television Review and Classification Board (MTRCB), indicating a "good" quality, and was released in theaters on June 1, 1988.

Critical response
Lav Diaz, writing for the Manila Standard, gave the film a negative review, criticizing the its storytelling for being muddled "from beginning to end" and hampered by poor direction, writing, sound design and lighting, as well as "kenkoy" action scenes.

References

External links

1988 films
1988 action films
Filipino-language films
Films about farmers
Films set in Manila
Films set in the 1950s
Philippine action films